is a 2022 action-adventure game developed by Tango Gameworks and published by Bethesda Softworks. The game released worldwide on March 25, 2022 as a one-year timed exclusive for PlayStation 5 and Windows. The game is set for release on Xbox Series X/S on April 12, 2023.

Gameplay 
Ghostwire: Tokyo is an action-adventure game played from a first-person perspective. The player can use various psychic and paranormal abilities to defeat the ghosts and spirits haunting Tokyo. Combat director Shinichiro Hara described the combat as "karate meets magic", as the player character utilizes hand movements inspired by Kuji-kiri hand gestures to cast spells. When an enemy loses most of their health, its core is exposed and the player can use takedown moves to destroy it. By defeating these spirits and collecting Yokai, the character will collect spirit points and resources used to upgrade their abilities.

Plot 
The game begins with a spirit  (Kazuhiko Inoue) flying over the scene of a traffic collision. The spirit is looking for a body to possess and decides on a boy named Akito (Kensuke Nishi) who was rendered unconscious from the accident. Akito wakes up, still in control of his body except for his right hand, which is under control of the spirit. Soon after, a terrifying fog rolls in, turning anyone caught in it into a spirit, but Akito is spared thanks to the spirit possessing him. A man in a Hannya mask (known only as Hannya (Shunsuke Sakuya)) appears on the digital signs near the area and uses a spell to summon evil entities, sealing the disembodied spirits of the civilians away in cages all across Shibuya. Akito is told by the spirit he needs to hunt Hannya down to stop him, but Akito convinces the spirit to let him go check on his sister, Mari (Asami Seto), who is in a coma at the local hospital.

The spirit grants Akito spirit-based powers to help him fight his way to Mari's room, but find that Hannya has beat them there and wants to use Mari for some sort of ritual. When Akito tries to interfere, Hannya stabs him through the chest and kidnaps Mari. As he lays dying, Akito has a flashback, showing that Mari is comatose due to a house fire. Akito talks to the spirit (who tells Akito to call him KK) and agrees to help him stop Hannya. KK saves Akito's life and tells him to go to a safe house KK had set up before he died.

At the safe house, KK reveals he was part of a team of investigators who tried to stop Hannya but failed. KK sends Akito to the Kagerie Observation tower to scan the town for clues, where they spot one of Hannya's allies going into an underground train station. The two follow and find an underground shrine where Hannya and his allies are preparing for their ritual. KK reveals that Hannya plans to steal enough souls to destroy the barrier between the world of the living and the dead so Hannya can resurrect his dead wife and daughter. Hannya and the others escape, leaving Akito to fight Hannya's ally, but in the course of the fight the enemy's mask gets blown off, revealing it is actually a puppet made from KK's human body. The puppet capitalizes on KK's shock to separate KK from Akito and seal him away, leaving Akito powerless.

Akito manages to escape to the surface and heads back to KK's safe house to figure out how to find him. There he meets one of KK's old partners, Rinko, who gives him KK's commuter pass case and a picture of KK's wife and son. Rinko also helps Akito use his lingering connection to KK to find and reunite with him. Just as the two reunite, a pillar of light appears, showing that Hannya has started his ritual. The two pursue after Hannya and confront him. Hannya's two other allies revealing themselves to be puppets made from Hannya's wife and daughter. Akito defeats the daughter puppet, but is delayed enough for Hannya to unleash a giant spirit monster upon the town and escape into the toxic fog.

Unable to follow on foot, KK reveals that Rinko made a custom made motorcycle capable of passing through the fog. After collecting additional parts to complete the bike, the two travel to Tokyo Tower and confront the mother puppet. At the top of the tower, Hannya takes Mari and jumps into the mouth of the giant spirit monster. Akito is attacked by the KK puppet again but manages to destroy it.

Akito and KK follow Hannya into the giant's mouth; Inside, they pass through a series of doors representing Akito and Mari's memories, revealing that Akito was an emotionally closed off person, which was only exacerbated by his parents' deaths. With the loss of her parents and Akito's coldness towards her, Mari fell into an almost suicidal depression. The two heroes catch up to Hannya as he opens a direct gate to the underworld, but before he can finish the ritual, Mari's spirit appears and throws into the gate. As her spirit starts to fade away, she tells Akito that her accident wasn't his fault. She reveals that she had a chance to escape the fire but went back to grab their parents' wedding rings as they were the only thing they had left of them. As Mari dies, Hannya climbs back out and fuses himself with his daughter and wife's spirits, turning himself into a monstrous amalgamation. The two heroes finish him off for good, freeing all the souls Hannya captured. The spirits of Akito's parents arrive to escort Mari to the afterlife as Akito promises her that he'll lead a good life from then on. With the crisis averted, Akito returns to the living world and KK's spirit leaves his body.

Development 
In June 2019, during Bethesda Softworkss press conference at E3 2019, Shinji Mikami and creative director Ikumi Nakamura announced Ghostwire: Tokyo, an action-adventure game with horror elements. Nakamura later resigned from Tango Gameworks in September 2019, leaving the studio after nine years. Unlike The Evil Within series of video games, Ghostwire is primarily an action-adventure game instead of a survival horror game, though the game still retains some horror themes and elements. Shinichirō Hara, who worked on the combat of 2016's Doom, joined Tango to help the team craft the game's action-oriented combat. According to him, the game's combat, which was largely inspired by Kuji-kiri and martial arts, enabled the team to "put a lot more movement and personality into the player action as the player's hands are organic extensions of the character". The game uses Unreal Engine 4.

Xbox Game Studios head Phil Spencer said that this deal would not affect the pre-existing plan to release Ghostwire: Tokyo as a console-exclusive on the PlayStation 5, and the game would eventually arrive on Xbox consoles at least one year after the initial release. Those who pre-ordered the Deluxe Edition via PlayStation Store were granted early access to the game on March 22, 2022. The game released for PlayStation 5 and Windows on March 25, 2022. 

On March 15, 2023, the game was announced to be releasing for the Xbox Series X/S on April 12, 2023 alongside a new content update for the game.

Reception 

Ghostwire: Tokyo received "generally favorable" reviews from critics, according to review aggregator Metacritic.

Reviewers linked the lack of polish and antiquated nature of the game's action elements to a "different era of action game design", while others, though reviewing the title positively, acknowledged the narrow target audience due to said elements.

Combat was criticized for lacking depth through its lack of combos, rudimentary skill tree, and slow and imprecise movement, but was praised for its engaging presentation, kinetic feel, and its use of the DualSense controller. Movement was also criticized for being slow and imprecise during combat. Several review outlets felt that the Ghostwire: Tokyo's premise was largely compelling, and that its story and characters were tightly written, but that none of these elements were fully realized.

Many outlets also claimed that the game felt particularly uninspired and repetitive after a while, and that it failed to do anything new or interesting with its premise in terms of gameplay. They also felt that the game's structure of cleansing gates was largely repetitive and criticized the underutilized potential of the linearly designed open world. The visual style and theming, atmosphere, dense design, and compact scale of the world was largely praised.

Some commended side quests for their weirder tones, engaging design, and short length, while others criticized them for being unmemorable and repetitive. Enemies were heavily praised for their haunting designs, but were criticized for the lack of variety and unchallenging design. Bosses in particular were deemed underwhelming in nature.

Prior to release, a number of outlets noted technical issues with the PC version of the game, citing stuttering as an issue.

The PlayStation 5 version of Ghostwire: Tokyo was the sixth bestselling retail game during its first week on sale in Japan, with 10,144 physical copies being sold.

Ghostwire: Tokyo received Awards for Excellence in Japan Game Awards 2022.

Notes

References

External links 
 

2022 video games
Action-adventure games
Bethesda Softworks games
PlayStation 5 games
Single-player video games
Tango Gameworks games
Unreal Engine games
Video games about spirit possession
Video games about ghosts
Video games about the paranormal
Video games developed in Japan
Video games set in Tokyo
Windows games